A Country Practice is an Australian television soap opera/serial which was broadcast on the Seven Network from 18 November 1981 until 22 November 1993, and subsequently on Network Ten from 13 April 1994 to 5 November 1994. Altogether, 14 seasons and 1,088 episodes were produced.

The show was produced at the ATN-7's production facility at Epping, New South Wales, Pitt Town and Oakville, suburbs on the outskirts of northwest Sydney, Australia, were used for most of the exterior filming, with the historic heritage-listed Clare House, built in 1838, serving as the location of the Wandin Valley Bush Nursing Hospital.

Many other fictional locations, including Dr. Terence Elliot's (Shane Porteous) medical practice, Frank and Shirley Gilroy's house Brian Wenzel and  Lorrae Desmond, the Wandin Valley Church and Burrigan High School where filmed in the Hawkesbury.

Several of the regular cast members became popular celebrities as a result of their roles in the series. It also featured a number of native Australian animals, particularly the iconic 'Fatso the wombat' adding to its appeal both domestically and internationally. After the series was cancelled by the Seven Network in 1993, the series was relaunched on the Network Ten in 1994.

At the time of its cancellation, A Country Practice was the longest-running Australian TV drama; however, by the late 1990s, that record was surpassed by Network Ten series Neighbours. At the height of its popularity, the show attracted 8–10 million Australian viewers weekly (at a time when the population of Australia was 15 million). The series was eventually sold to, and broadcast in 48 countries.

Creation
A Country Practice creator and executive producer James Davern had previously worked on a similar rural-based series as the producer and director of the long-running Bellbird, which screened on ABC Television (1967–1977). In 1979, he entered the pilot episode for a script contest by Network Ten, which was looking for a new hit soap opera after the demise of Number 96. Davern came third and won a merit award. Although TEN turned the series down, rival TV station Seven Network picked it up. Davern's contribution to the industry was recognised when he was honoured with the Order of Austraklia (OAM) in 2014.

Production

Format
Though sometimes considered a soap opera, the storylines of the show's two 45 minute episodes screened over any one week formed a self-contained narrative block. The storylines were meant to have a primary appeal to adult and older youthful audiences, and in particular they had greater appeal to children from middle-class backgrounds. As it did not have the open ended narrative of a traditional soap opera, it was technically a "series". Nevertheless, many storylines were developed as sub-plots for several episodes before becoming the focus of a particular week's narrative block. Overall, the program "so emphasized the ongoing storylines of its major characters as to make the distinction between series and serial more or less meaningless".

Cancellation and continuation
After the end of its run on the Seven Network, it was announced that the serial would be picked up by Network Ten with a mainly new cast and a few key cast members continuing from the Seven series. Unlike the Seven series which was produced in Sydney, the Network Ten series was produced in Melbourne with location shooting in Emerald, Victoria. The new series debuted in April 1994, but was not as successful and was abruptly cancelled in November. The series featured actors including Paul Gleason, Jane Hall, Vince Colosimo, Claudia Black and Laura Armstrong.

Cast

Main cast (Seven Network series) 1981-1993
NOTE: Actors highlighted in pink were original cast members.
Note: Actors highlighted in yellow were retained in the series when switching from Seven Network to Network Ten.

Network Ten (primary and recurring cast) (1994)  
Only four of the original cast members from the Network Seven series were retained in the Network Ten re-launch: Joan Sydney, Joyce Jacobs, and Andrew Blackman, and Michelle Pettigrove (1 episode)

Celebrity guest stars
A Country Practice became renowned for its long list of guest cameos, totalling over 1000 stars, with well known mainly Australian actors who appeared in each week's two part episode arc.

At the program's height, Prime Minister of Australia Bob Hawke appeared in episodes as a guest as himself.

Some actors became more prominent during the series run, and were classified as semi-regulars, appearing as the storyline permitted,

Famous stars included:

Episodes

Setting and stories
The series followed the workings of a small hospital in the fictional New South Wales rural country town of Wandin Valley, as well as its connected medical clinic, the town's veterinary surgery, RSL club/pub and local police station. The show's storylines focused on the staff and regular patients of the hospital and general practice, their families, and other residents of the town. Through its weekly guest actors, it explored various social and medical problems. The series examined such topical issues as youth unemployment, suicide, drug addiction, HIV/AIDS and terminal illness. Apart from its regular rotating cast, A Country Practice also had a cast of semi-regulars who made appearances as the storylines permitted. The program also showcased a number of animal stars and Australian native wildlife, most famously Fatso the wombat. Fatso was played throughout the series by three separate wombats, the original actually named Fatso (1981–1986) was replaced due to temperament issues with the cast, a wombat George (1986–1990), he himself replaced due to early signs of wombat mange (a marsupial viral disease), and Garth (1990 through series end).

Highest rating episode
Anne Tenney played Molly Jones, who became one of the most popular characters, particularly in the series' early years. Molly, was an unconventional fashion designer, farmer and Green-hugging local environmentalist, and after Tenney decided to leave the series, her character's death episode became the highest rating, and most remembered storyline. The series 13 week storyline arc dealt with how a young woman, as well as her husband and local residents, coped with terminal illness, after the character was diagnosed with leukaemia. The final episode sees the character of Molly sitting in her back garden and waving while her husband, Brendan, is teaching his daughter to fly a kite. He sees Molly is fading, and calls her name as the screen fades to black. This storyline arc was originally written to be featured over a continuing 11 week script. A producer realised that the ratings were not being monitored during this period, so it was extended for 13 weeks, and hence 4 extra 1 hour episodes.

Other iconic storylines over its 12-year run include the wedding of Dr. Simon Bowen (Grant Dodwell) to local vet Vicki Dean (Penny Cook) in 1983, the death of nurse Donna Manning in a car crash in 1987, and the off-screen death of longtime resident Shirley Gilroy, played by original Lorrae Desmond in a plane crash in 1992.

Logie Awards
A Country Practice is the third most successful television program after Home and Away (1st) and Neighbours (2nd), at the Logie Awards, having won 29 awards during its twelve years of production.

Logie Awards 1983
Best Supporting Actor In A Series: Brian Wenzel 
Best Juvenile Performance: Jeremy Shadlow

Logie awards 1984
Most Popular Actor: Grant Dodwell 
NSW Most Popular Female: Penny Cook 
NSW Most Popular Show: A Country Practice 
Most Popular Drama Series: A Country Practice 
Best Supporting Actress In A Series: Lorrae Desmond

Logie Awards 1985
Most Popular Lead Actor: Grant Dodwell 
Most Popular Lead Actress: Anne Tenney 
NSW Most Popular Male: Grant Dodwell 
NSW Most Popular Female: Penny Cook
NSW Most Popular Show: A Country Practice 
Most Popular Drama Program: A Country Practice 
Best Lead Actor In A Series: Shane Withington 
Best Supporting Actress In A Series: Wendy Strehlow

Logie Awards 1986
Most Popular Australian Actor: Grant Dodwell 
Most Popular Australian Actress: Anne Tenney 
NSW Most Popular Female: Anne Tenney 
NSW Most Popular Program: A Country Practice 
Most Popular Australian Drama: A Country Practice

Logie Awards 1987
NSW Most Popular Program: A Country Practice

Logie Awards 1988
NSW Most Popular Program: A Country Practice

Logie Awards 1989
Most Outstanding Actress: Joan Sydney 
NSW Most Popular Program: A Country Practice

Logie Awards 1990
Most Outstanding Actor: Shane Porteous 
Most Popular New Talent: Georgie Parker

Logie Awards 1991
Most Popular Actress: Georgie Parker

Logie Awards 1992
Most Popular Actress: Georgie Parker

Logie Awards 1993
Most Popular Actress: Georgie Parker

Broadcast
A Country Practice originally aired on Seven Network Monday (Part 1) and Tuesday (Part 2) nights at 7:30.  The unsuccessful 1994 Network 10 remake of the series aired originally at 7:30 on Wednesday nights, but then moved to 7:30 on Saturday nights a few weeks later. In late July, it moved to a low-rating timeslot of 5:30 Saturday evenings, directly against Channel Seven's Saturday AFL coverage.

Seven also aired repeats of the original series at 9:30 weekday mornings from 1995 to 2002.

Foxtel's Hallmark Channel broadcast the complete series twice (including the short-lived Network Ten series) in a 2-hour block at 3:30-5:30 weekday afternoons from 2002 to 30 June 2010.

In 2014, 7TWO ran repeats at 02:00 on weekday mornings.

International broadcasts

United Kingdom
In addition to being broadcast in Australia, the series also had a successful run on the ITV network in the United Kingdom. A Country Practice began 27 October 1982, less than a year after its debut on Seven Network in Australia.

Originally, the series was partially networked (similar in theory to syndication) by Thames Television, the weekday contractor for the London area, to a cluster of five ITV regions; Anglia Television, Border Television, Tyne Tees, Yorkshire Television and TVS. These regions all aired one weekly episode on Wednesdays at 14:45–15:45, and in the original hour-long format. The remaining ITV regions – Central Independent Television, Channel Television,HTV, TSW, Granada Television, Scottish Television, UTV, and Grampian Television –  all started later, with UTV being the last to start in late 1989. Most of the ITV regions began scheduling the program on a day and time of their own choice and were at vastly different points in the storyline by the time the series was put on hiatus in a handful of regions for a new Australian series, Richmond Hill, which took the Wednesday and Thursday afternoon 14:00 slot from October 1988. When that series ended in August the following year, A Country Practice was resumed as its replacement (although some regions, such as Central and Granada, had continued to show it). By around May 1990 (regions do vary), the ITV network decided to adopt the method established by Yorkshire Television (from  1984) of editing each episode into two half-hour editions which allowed the series to be stripped Monday to Friday, usually before, or after, the lunchtime edition of Home and Away. This format also resulted in curtailment of the full closing credits in certain regions. Scottish Television was the only exception, and they chose various days and timeslots, but always screened A Country Practice in the original hour-long format.

A substantial amount were withdrawn from transmission by some regions as the content was considered unsuitable for daytime viewing and this inevitably led to considerable chunks of the story being skipped. Considered a daytime soap and notably several years behind Australian broadcasts, A Country Practice was popular in the UK and achieved consolidated viewing figures of between 2–3 million. Some regions (HTV, Border, Grampian, TSW and Granada) moved the later episodes of the series to an early evening slot of 17.10–17.40.

ITV regional broadcasts
Originally starting in 1982, Yorkshire Television were the first region to break away from the network transmissions in October 1984 and began editing each episode into two half-hour episodes, screening on Mondays and Tuesdays at 15:30. This led to continuity problems as whenever a public holiday occurred (on Monday), the 15:30 slot would be unavailable. The series was moved back to an early afternoon hour-long format in 1988 when Sons and Daughters was aired five afternoons a week at 15:30. A Country Practice then replaced Sons and Daughters when that series ended in March 1989, again split into half-hour episodes and shown five afternoons a week for the first time. It was then moved to an early afternoon slot, and eventually hour-long episodes were reinstated. The series concluded in March 1998 and the Network Ten series was not shown.  When Tyne Tees Television merged with Yorkshire, a number of episodes were skipped. This was to allow an alignment of schedules for the two regions.
 TVS and Thames Television followed Yorkshire in September 1988 and started showing three half-hour episodes a week, from Monday to Wednesday, at 12:30–13:00.
 Central Television did not follow the other ITV regions and began A Country Practice in July 1983, airing weekly on Tuesdays, 11:10–12:00, during the summer of 1983, but by September, the series had been shelved. In 1990, while all the other ITV regions were well into their respective runs, Central re-launched the series, and they followed Thames, Yorkshire and TVS with half-hour episodes and were considerably behind the rest of the ITV network. In May, it appeared in a  new afternoon slot 14:00-14:30 and stripped Monday to Friday. In September 1990, this changed to 13:50-14:20. From January 1993, moves to 13:15-13:45, and then briefly switches to a  mid-afternoon slot, 14:50–15:20 in September 1993, and then 15:00-15:30 until the end of the year. Returns to 14:50-15:20 until March 1994, after which, it is moved back  to lunchtimes at 13:55–14:25. By 1997, Central was airing A Country Practice at 12:55-13:25, and in 1998, the network concluded the original series in April in the 13:00–13:30 slot, and then immediately commenced the short-lived Network Ten version, finally completing all the episodes on Friday, 31 July 1998.
 Scottish Television started broadcasting the series in 1983 and always aired A Country Practice as hour-long episodes. Throughout the 1980s the program moved about in time and day but was generally broadcast once a week in an afternoon slot. In January 1994, after (episode #486), it was dropped from the schedules for about 4 months until June. From episode 491 screened every weekday morning at 10:55 for the duration of the summer school holidays (around 6 weeks) until 2 September. It reverted to its old weekly Tuesday slot the following week. It was the dropped completely after episode #588, during 1996. Although the company took over Grampian Television, the series continued until the end, doing so by airing daily episodes during the summer of 1998.
 HTV started the series on Wednesday, 26 October 1983, broadcasting 1 hour episodes until 1990, when the series moved to 15:25 Wed-Fri as replacement for Sons and Daughters in half-hour format. From September 1993, moved to earlier time slot, but from March 1994, began airing in the early evening 17:10–17:40 slot. By the end of 1998, the series had been reduced to being shown on Thursdays and Fridays only. From January to March 1999, the series was shown on Tuesday through to Friday until Friday 5 March 1999 when the final Channel Seven episode was reached. HTV were the last ITV region to complete the series (and did not show the short lived Channel 10 series).
 Carlton Television, who superseded Thames Television, became the first region to conclude the series, followed closely by Anglia Television in the daily 13:50–14:20 half-hour slot in April 1996. Anglia Television then commenced a short repeat of the first 40 episodes shortly after reaching the end.
Granada Television originally began in the 14:00-15:00 slot in January 1984 and from January 1994, until they aired the last episode during the autumn of 1996, moved the series to the later 17:10–17:40 slot. Border Television had, by now, aligned with Granada's run of the series and followed suit.
TSW and Channel Television did not begin until 1984, and initially aired A Country Practice weekly on Tuesdays at 14:00–15:00. In August 1989, TSW added an additional hour long episode on Thursdays (replacing Richmond Hill). In 1990, TSW followed the rest of the English ITV regions and aired five, half-hour episodes, Monday to Friday, at lunchtimes, before moving the series to 17:10-17:40  until it concluded the series in 1998. Due to changes in their networking arrangements, Channel Television aligned with TVS broadcasts rather than TSW broadcasts from January 1986, meaning some episodes were skipped in the Channel Islands. 
UTV dropped A Country Practice in early September 1998. At that particular point, UTV had been airing episodes only once a week - on Mondays - at 2:45pm, in a 30-minute slot. UTV had reached episodes from early 1993, season 13.

Satellite and Cable broadcasts
 In the mid-1980s, A Country Practice was a prime-time series on Sky Channel, airing twice a week at 20:00 from at least 1985. During August 1985, the series was screened at 19:20 and 20:10 on Tuesday and Thursday evenings in hour-long episodes and by 1986, it was screened at 20:00. The channel also screened The Sullivans and The Young Doctors. When the Sky Channel was launched on the new Astra 1A satellite in January 1989, it became Sky1 and A Country Practice was dropped from the schedule.  For a brief period, later episodes were shown in 1997 on the cable channel Carlton Select.

Only the first 40 episodes have ever been repeated in the UK, in 1998 when ITV contractor, Anglia Television, were the only region to repeat any episodes.  Unlike other Australian soaps, which became cult viewing due to multiple runs; Prisoner was broadcast twice, first on ITV, and then Channel 5; The Sullivans also had two full runs, once on ITV and repeated on UK Gold; and also Sons and Daughters, which had three runs, first on ITV, then UK Gold, and finally, Channel 5 – A Country Practice has never been repeated in the UK or achieved the cult status of other soap operas of the same era.

European screenings

France
A Country Practice was named "À Coeur Ouvert". The series premiered on FR3 in 1989.

Germany
A Country Practice was named Das Buschkrankenhaus (The Country Hospital), and aired on Sat 1 in 1985, and then on ARD from 1989 to 1991.

Italy
A Country Practice was named "Wandin Valley". Only 170 episodes were broadcast on local television stations in Italy, and the dub was made at TSI in Switzerland.

Ireland
Episode one debuted on RTÉ Two on Monday, 23 September 1985 at 18:15 airing weekdays. Start time later moved to 18:30. RTE split each episode in two to fill a 30-minute slot. On 3 October 1988, to make way for Home and Away, RTE moved ACP to the main channel RTÉ One, continuing weekdays at 17:30 in a 30-minute slot. The final episode (1088) aired on 13 February 1997. Between 1998 and 2002, RTÉ rebroadcast seasons 8-10 (1988-1990). Episodes aired around midday and later moved to 09:30.

Norway
A Country Practice (called "Hverdagsliv") was broadcast on TV2 from the channel's inception in 1992 to 2000.

Africa

Kenya
A Country Practice was also transmitted on Kenyan Television (VoK now KBC) during the 1980s.

Zimbabwe
A Country Practice was broadcast on ZBC state television in the 1980s.

Oceania

New Zealand
A Country Practice was first transmitted on TV2 on the afternoon of Thursday 13 February 1986. It was shown once a week on Thursdays at 2.30pm before moving to twice a week on Wednesdays and Thursdays at 6.30pm by 1987. By 1988, the series went back to once a week on Sundays at around 4pm, and by 1989 an additional episode was broadcast on Saturdays in the same timeslot. By 1990, A Country Practice screened on Channel 2 on Saturdays and Sundays at 5pm until it moved to TV One during the final months of 1991 replacing Fair Go, where it was shown once a week on Tuesdays at 7.30pm until the end of 1992.

North America

Canada
The entire series was broadcast by CBC Television outlet CBET in Windsor, Ontario. Two episodes were broadcast daily, Monday through Friday, starting in the late 1980s, until they were caught up to contemporary episodes in the early 1990s. Its inclusion on CBET's schedule was out of necessity to fill a television schedule: because Windsor stations cannot carry programming licensed for broadcast in the United States.  Many Australian soap operas, A Country Practice among them, thus found loyal audiences in the Metro Detroit area, while they otherwise remain unknown in North America.

From 1991 to 1994, the show also aired on ASN, a cable network that served Canada's Maritimes. Four hour-long episodes aired each week, from Monday to Thursday with Monday's and Tuesday's episodes repeated on Saturday and Wednesday's and Thursday's episodes on Sunday. The station aired the show from episode 1 to somewhere in the early 700s.

ASN ceased carrying the show when specialty cable channel Showcase was launched on 1 January 1995, as they picked up A Country Practice for broadcast throughout Canada. It broadcast one episode daily, from Monday to Friday, and completed the entire series run (including the 30-episode Network Ten series) in June 1999. It began rebroadcasting the entire series on 28 June 1999, with promises that the entire series would be broadcast for those who missed the first airing. However, a single line of text scrolling across the bottom of the screen during 21 August 2000, episode announced that the show would be removed from the Showcase lineup as of Monday, 28 August 2000. According to the station's email autoresponse at the time, the decision was based on "declining viewership and a demand by viewers for more current programming".

Novel
Series writer Judith Colquhoun, who also wrote episodes for other Australian serials, Blue Heelers, Neighbours and Home and Away released a novel in 2015.  Called New Beginnings, it is based on the early episodes of the series from 1981.  This was followed up by two further novels from the same author, To Everything a Season and Silver Linings.

DVD release
In late 2005, MRA Entertainment announced they had obtained the rights to release the entire series on DVD. In 2008, Magna Pacific Pty Ltd bought out MRA Entertainment, with plans to release Series 6, however the rights were then acquired by Beyond Home Entertainment which then re-released the first 5 seasons in 2007–2008, followed by Season 6 in 2010. On 27 May 2020 Via Vision Entertainment announced they would be releasing season 11 on DVD on 26 August 2020.

7plus streaming service 
As of January 2021 Channel 7's streaming service 7plus has made Seasons 1-14 available.

See also
 List of longest-running Australian television series
 List of longest-serving soap opera actors

References

External links
 Wandin Valley Bush Nursing Hospital.
 Encyclopedia of Television.
 .
 .
A Country Practice at the National Film and Sound Archive.
"Holding the Mirror Up to Wendy" – Interview with Wendy Strehlow (2014)
"Calm Life Mind" – Interview with Gavin Harrison (2015)

Seven Network original programming
Network 10 original programming
Australian television soap operas
Australian medical television series
Television shows set in New South Wales
Television shows set in Victoria (Australia)
1981 Australian television series debuts
1994 Australian television series endings